Lake Fryxell is a frozen lake  long, between Canada Glacier and Commonwealth Glaciers at the lower end of Taylor Valley in Victoria Land, Antarctica. It was mapped in the early 1900s and named during Operation Deep Freeze in the 1950s. There are several forms of algae living in the waters and a weather station located at the lake.

Geography
The lake is dammed by Canada Glacier, making it so that it has no natural outflow. There are a few small islands as well as several shallow areas.

Watershed
Where a few of the streams enter the lake there are well-developed deltas. The streams flow for about 4–12 weeks out of the year. Nearly half of the water flowing into the lake comes from Canada, Lost Seal, and Von Guerard streams.

Climate
Lake Fryxell is located within the McMurdo Dry Valleys, which experience an exceptionally dry climate partially due to katabatic winds descending from the nearby mountains. These winds can exceed  under certain conditions and can raise the temperature, melting snow and evaporating water.

Lake Fryxell Camp

Mapped by the British Antarctic Expedition under Robert Falcon Scott, 1910–13, the lake was visited by Professor T.L. Péwé during Operation Deep Freeze, 1957–58, who named it for Dr. Fritiof M. Fryxell, glacial geologist of Augustana College, Illinois.

Lake Fryxell is a focus of scientific research and contains a semi-permanent camp containing four labs and two other buildings. Electricity is generated at the camp using solar panels and a wind turbine. The four labs are used for experimenting with radioactive materials, electronics, chemicals and other materials. When staying at the camp, researchers sleep in tents, some of which are the same style as those used in some Antarctic expeditions in the early 20th century. There is internet and phone access at the camp.

Research activities largely deal with the lake itself and can include scientists diving into the water. The camp has existed since at least 1984.

Ecology
There are multiple forms of algae within the lake, including a sizable population of sulfate-reducing bacteria. Some samples of these bacteria live in very specific areas, such as specific water depths or locations causing them to experience differing physiochemical conditions. There are also a few archaea living in the anoxic zone, that contribute to the methane pockets under 12 m below the surface.

This creates an environment similar to the planet about 2.4 billion years ago. Within anoxic areas, scientists have found microbial mats that create small pockets saturated with oxygen.

See also
 Andrews Creek
 Coral Ridge
 List of Antarctic field camps
 Lake Washburn (Antarctica)

References

External links 

Lakes of Victoria Land
Meromictic lakes
Saline lakes of Antarctica
Endorheic lakes of Antarctica
McMurdo Dry Valleys